Méounes-lès-Montrieux is a commune in the Var department in the Provence-Alpes-Côte d'Azur region in southeastern France.

Places of interest
Charterhouse of Montrieux (from “mont rivis”, the mount of the stream), founded in 1137.

See also
Communes of the Var department

References

External links

 Méounes-lès-Montrieux official website
 Montrieux Charterhouse's website

Communes of Var (department)